This page is intended to serve as a list of notable alumni of The Citadel.

Military
 Colonel Charles C. Tew CSA (1846) first graduate of the college; served as professor and Commandant of the Citadel Academy and Superintendent of the Arsenal Academy, founded Hillsborough Military Academy in North Carolina. Killed in action at the Battle of Antietam in 1862 on the eve of his promotion to brigadier general.
 BrigGen Johnson Hagood CSA (1847) commanded Confederate forces in Charleston during the attack on Fort Wagner depicted in the movie Glory. Governor of South Carolina 1880–82 and instrumental in reopening The Citadel after occupation by Federal troops at the end of the Civil War, Johnson Hagood Stadium, where The Citadel plays its home football games, is named for him.
 BrigGen Micah Jenkins CSA (1854) First Honor Graduate of his class, one of the "boy generals" at age of 26; he was a favorite of General Robert E. Lee, killed in action at the Battle of the Wilderness. Jenkins Hall, which houses the Military Sciences and Commandant's Office is named in his honor
 MajGen Evander M. Law CSA (1856) fought in 13 major engagements during the Civil War, wounded four times and youngest general in Army of Northern Virginia.  Founded South Florida Military College, Law Barracks is named in his honor
 LtGen James T. Moore USMC (1916) early Marine aviator who held important command positions in USMC aviation during World War II, famous as Pappy Boyington's boss in the South Pacific air war and featured in the 1970s TV show Baa Baa Black Sheep.
 MajGen Lewie G. Merritt USMC (1917) pioneer in Marine aviation who developed tactics of dive bombing and close air support, commanded several major flying units in World War II. Namesake of Marine Corps Air Station Beaufort, South Carolina.
 General William O. Brice USMC (1921) another early Marine flier who led units during World War II and Korea. Commanding General, Fleet Marine Force, Pacific; Assistant Commandant for Air and Assistant Chief of Naval Operations for Marine Aviation. Youngest Marine Corps general in World War II, first Marine aviator four-star general.
 General Edwin A. Pollock USMC (1921) Navy Cross winner at Guadalcanal in 1942, led the 2d Marine Division during combat in Korea. Also commanded 1st Marine Division and only Marine to have commanded both the Pacific and Atlantic Fleet Marine Forces. Instrumental in founding the Marine Military Academy in Harlingen, Texas; served as first President and Commandant. Chairman of The Citadel Board of Visitors and named Chairman Emeritus upon retirement.
 Vice Admiral Bernard L. Austin USN (1922) Director of the Joint Staff and President of the Naval War College, 2-time winner of the Navy Cross (attended 2 years, USNA graduate) 
 Major Thomas D. Howie USA (1929) Immortalized during World War II as “The Major of St. Lo”; leader of the battalion that captured the strategic city of Saint-Lô, France (where he was killed). Inspiration for the character of Captain John Miller in Saving Private Ryan
 General William Westmoreland USA (1935) Commander of US forces in Vietnam, Chief of Staff of the United States Army; father James R. (1900) served as Chairman of the Board of Visitors in the 1940s and son James A. graduated in 1961 (attended one year, USMA graduate)
 LtCol George Bray McMillan USAAF (1938) Pilot with the Flying Tigers, Squadron Commander in the 51st Fighter Group, combat ace with 8.5 aerial victories. Shot down and killed near Pingsang, China in June, 1944
 LtCol Horace Ellis Crouch USAF (1940) Bombardier/Navigator on crew #10 of the Doolittle Raid, also flew combat missions in China later in World War II and in Korea
 LtGen George M. Seignious USA (1942) appointed by President Johnson as military advisor to the Paris Peace Talks in 1968; Commanding General, 3d Infantry Division and United States Army Berlin.  Deputy Assistant Secretary of Defense, Director of the Joint Staff, President of The Citadel 1974–1979. Seignious Hall, the football facility at The Citadel is named for him.
 MajGen James Grimsley Jr. USA (1942) combat veteran of World War II and Vietnam earning 2 Silver Stars, former Deputy Assistant Secretary of Defense. President of The Citadel 1980–89 and President Emeritus 1989–2013
 LtGen Herbert Beckington USMC (1943) Military Aide to Vice President Hubert Humphrey,  Assistant Commandant for Plans and Operations
 LtGen James B. Vaught USA (1946) Commander of Operation Eagle Claw in 1980; former Commanding General of ROK-US Combined Forces Command
 LtGen Donald E. Rosenblum USA (1951)  Commanding General, 1st Army and 24th Infantry Division; Deputy Commanding General, XVIII Airborne Corps
 LtGen Claudius E. Watts III USAF (1958) Fulbright Scholar and Comptroller of the USAF, President of The Citadel 1989–96
 LtGen Carmen Cavezza USA (1961) awarded 2 Silver Stars for combat service in Vietnam, served as Military Assistant to Secretary of Defense Caspar Weinberger. Commanding General of 7th Infantry Division, US Army Infantry Center and I Corps
 General William W. Hartzog USA (1963) Commanding General, US Army Training and Doctrine Command; Commanding General of 1st Infantry Division and U.S. Army, South
 LtGen Frank Libutti USMC (1966) Commanding General Marine Forces Pacific, Marine Forces Korea and 1st Marine Division
 LtGen John B. Sams USAF (1967) Vice Commander Air Mobility Command, Commander 15th Air Force.
 LtGen William M. Steele USA (1967) Commanding General U.S. Army Pacific, Combined Arms Center and 82nd Airborne Division
 LtGen John P. Costello USA (1969) Commanding General United States Army Space and Missile Defense Command and United States Army Air Defense Artillery School
 LtGen John W. Rosa USAF (1973) Superintendent of the United States Air Force Academy 2003–05, President of The Citadel 2006-18
 LtGen John Kimmons USA (1974) Chief of Staff for the Director of National Intelligence, U.S. Army Assistant Chief of Staff for Intelligence, Commanding General, United States Army Intelligence and Security Command
 LtGen Daniel P. Bolger USA (1978) Commanding General, Combined Security Transition Command-Afghanistan and Commander, NATO Training Mission-Afghanistan; U.S. Army Assistant Chief of Staff for Operations and Training; Commanding General, 1st Cavalry Division and Joint Readiness Training Center
 LtGen Michael Ferriter USA (1979) Commanding General, Installation Management Command/U.S. Army Assistant Chief of Staff for Installation Management; Commanding General NATO Training Mission - Iraq and United States Army Infantry Center
 LtGen Lawrence D. Nicholson USMC (1979) Commanding General III Marine Expeditionary Force and 1st Marine Division
 General Kenneth F. McKenzie, Jr. USMC (1979)  current Commander, United States Central Command; former Director of the Joint Staff and Commanding General, United States Marine Forces Central Command
 General Glenn M. Walters USMC (1979) 34th Assistant Commandant of the Marine Corps, current President of The Citadel.
 MajGen Glenn K. Rieth ARNG (1980) Adjutant General of New Jersey 2002–11
 Colonel Cesar "Rico" Rodriguez USAF (1981) F-15 pilot with 2 aerial victories in Operation Desert Storm and 1 in Bosnia; leading MIG killer of all U.S. aviators since Vietnam
 MajGen Roy V. McCarty (1982) current South Carolina Adjutant General
 LtGen John B. Cooper USAF (1983) Air Force Deputy Chief of Staff for Logistics, Engineering and Force Protection
 LtGen Thomas S. James Jr. USA (1985) current Commanding General, First United States Army; former Commanding General, 7th Infantry Division and United States Army Armor School
 LtGen Francis M. Beaudette USA (1989) Commanding General United States Army Special Operations Command
 MajGen David Wilson USA (1991) current Commanding General, 8th Theater Sustainment Command; first black Alumni to attain 2 star rank in any of the Armed Services and the first black General Officer Alumni on active duty in the United States Army.
 Colonel Randolph Bresnik USMC (1989) F/A-18 pilot and NASA Astronaut. Mission Specialist on STS-129 Space Shuttle Atlantis in November, 2009; Commander of the International Space Station September - December, 2017
 Major Whit Collins USAF (2006) Opposing Solo and Slot Pilot with the United States Air Force Thunderbirds 2016-19
 SFC Christopher Celiz USA (2008) posthumously awarded the Congressional Medal of Honor for heroic actions in Afghanistan while assigned to the 75th Ranger Regiment in 2018 (attended 2 years)

Business
 Charles E. Daniel (1918),  R. Hugh Daniel (1929) – co-founders of Daniel International Corporation, at one time the largest construction company in the world. Major Citadel benefactors for whom Daniel Library is named.
 Randolph Guthrie (1925) Chairman of the Board, Studebaker 
 Alvah Chapman Jr.(1942) CEO and Chairman of Knight Ridder, at one time the largest newspaper publishing company in the U.S.
 Eugene Figg (1958) Founder and CEO of Figg Engineering Group, one of the world's largest bridge building companies. Nationally prominent structural engineer and designer of the Sunshine Skyway Bridge
 BGen Harvey Schiller, PhD (1960) CEO of YankeeNets, a conglomerate that owns the New York Yankees, New Jersey Nets and New Jersey Devils; President, Turner Sports; CEO of Global Options Group; Chairman, Collegiate Sports Management Group
 Tandy Clinton Rice, Jr. (1961) Owner of Top Billing, one of the leading talent booking firms in Nashville; manager for country music stars including Dolly Parton, Porter Wagoner, Waylon Jennings, Chet Atkins and Hank Williams, Jr.  Member of the Country Music Hall of Fame, former President of the Country Music Association.
 William B. Sansom (1964) Chairman, Tennessee Valley Authority, CEO of H. T. Hackney Company
 LtGen John Sams (1967) Vice President, Boeing
 LTG Michael Ferriter (1979) President and CEO, National Veterans Memorial and Museum

Sports

 Andy Sabados (1939) Guard, Chicago Cardinals 1939–40
 Paul Maguire (1960) Lead the nation in touchdown receptions by a Tight End as a senior in 1959, 3d Team Associated Press All American. Tight End and Punter with Los Angeles/San Diego Chargers and Buffalo Bills 1960–70. Played on 3 consecutive AFL championship teams and in 6 of 10 championship games; one of only 20 players who were members of the American Football League from its inception in 1960 until its merger with the NFL in 1970. Longtime color commentator for college and NFL games with NBC and ESPN, member of The Citadel Athletic Hall of Fame
 Dr.Harvey Schiller (1960) Commissioner, Southeastern Conference NCAA 1986–90; Executive Director, United States Olympic Committee 1990–94; President, Atlanta Thrashers NHL 1994–99; CEO New York Yankees/New York Nets/New Jersey Devils 1999–2007; President, International Baseball Federation 2007–09 and current member Board of Directors, Baseball Hall of Fame; Commercial Commissioner, America's Cup; President of USA Team Handball. Named several times by Sporting News as one of the 100 Most Powerful People in Sports; recipient of IOC Olympic Order, member of New York Athletic Club and Citadel Athletic Halls of Fame. Retired Air Force Brigadier General and combat transport pilot in Vietnam
 John Small, Sr. (1970) 2d Team Associated Press All-American linebacker and 1st Team selection by Sporting News and Time Magazine; Atlanta Falcons 1970–72, Detroit Lions 1973–75. Member of The Citadel and South Carolina Athletic Halls of Fame, named to the Southern Conference 75th Anniversary Team. 1st round draft pick by Falcons in 1970.
 Ellis Johnson (1975) Head Football Coach of The Citadel, Gardner–Webb and Southern Mississippi University; Assistant Coach at Alabama, Auburn, Clemson and South Carolina
 Fred Jordan (1979) Head Baseball Coach, The Citadel 1992 – 2017.  Winningest coach in school and Southern Conference history with 831 victories; 13 regular season and tournament conference championships, 7 NCAA tournament appearances, 4 time Southern Conference Coach of the Year, 36 players selected in MLB draft.
 Lyvonia "Stump" Mitchell (1981) holder of school records for season and career rushing yards; 3d Team 1-A All American, Southern Conference Player of the Year and #2 rusher in the country in 1980, Southern Conference Male Athlete of the Year and South Carolina Amateur Athlete of the Year. Running back and kick returner for St Louis Cardinals/Phoenix Cardinals 1981–89, Kansas City Chiefs 1990; second on Cardinals career all purpose yardage list (11,985), second in career rushing yards and career 100 yard rushing games. Assistant Coach San Antonio Riders 1992, Head Coach Morgan State University 1996–98, Running Backs Coach Seattle Seahawks 1999–2007 and Assistant Head Coach/Running Backs Coach Washington Redskins 2008–09; Head Coach of Southern University 2010–12, Running Backs Coach Arizona Cardinals 2013–17, New York Jets 2017–19 and Cleveland Browns 2019-.  One of only 6 Citadel players to have jersey retired, inducted into The Citadel Athletic Hall of Fame and South Carolina Athletic Hall of Fame.
 Byron Walker (1982) Wide Receiver, Seattle Seahawks 1982-86
 Tim Jones (1983) infielder for the St. Louis Cardinals 1988–93
 John Hartwell (1987) Athletic Director, Utah State University
 Greg Davis (1987) kicker for Oakland, San Diego, New England, Minnesota, Atlanta, and Arizona 1987–98; co-holder of NFL record for most 50+ yard field goals in a game (3), third on Cardinals all-time scoring list with 484 points. Member of The Citadel Athletic Hall of Fame
 Ed Conroy (1989) Current Assistant Basketball Coach at Vanderbilt University; former Head Coach at Francis Marion University, The Citadel and Tulane University
 Tony Skole (1991) Current Head Baseball Coach, The Citadel; Head Baseball Coach East Tennessee State University 2000–2017. Starter on baseball and football teams who played in College World Series and on 2 1-AA playoff teams, member of Citadel Athletic Hall of Fame.
 Lester Smith Jr. (1992) 2 time 1-AA All-American and 3 time All Southern Conference selection at Safety; CFL player with Baltimore Stallions 1994–95, Toronto Argonauts 1996–98 and Montreal Alouettes 1999–2001; CFL All-Star and member of 2 Grey Cup Champions. Had Citadel jersey retired and member of Athletic Hall of Fame
 Dan McDonnell (1992) Head Baseball Coach, University of Louisville 2007– ; rivals.com National Coach of the Year, 2007. 5 appearances in College World Series, member of The Citadel Athletic Hall of Fame.
 Chris Lemonis (1992) Current Head Baseball Coach Mississippi State University, won the 2021 National Championship in just his second season. Head Baseball Coach Indiana University 2015-18. 6 appearances in the College World Series as a player, Assistant Coach and Head Coach.
 Travis Jervey (1995) fullback Green Bay Packers 1995–98, San Francisco 49ers 1999–2000 and Atlanta Falcons 2001–03. First member of Packers named to Pro Bowl as special teams player; only alumni to play in the Super Bowl and member of Packers Championship team in Super Bowl XXXI, 1997. Member of South Carolina and Citadel Athletic Halls of Fame.
 Britt Reames (1996) Pitcher with St. Louis Cardinals 2000, Montreal Expos 2001–03, Oakland Athletics 2005 and Pittsburgh Pirates 2006. Pitching Coach at Furman University and The Citadel 2008-17, member of The Citadel Athletic Hall of Fame
 Dallas McPherson (2001) 3rd Base Anaheim Angels 2004–06, Florida Marlins 2008 and Chicago White Sox 2011; current Manager of Class A Vancouver Canadians
 Cliff Washburn (2002) All-Southern Conference selection in basketball and football, played in East-West Shrine Game and Hula Bowl. Offensive tackle for numerous teams in the NFL, World League of American Football, United Football League and CFL. Member of The Citadel Athletic Hall of Fame.
 Nehemiah Broughton (2005) fullback Washington Redskins 2005–08, New York Giants 2009 and Arizona Cardinals 2009–10
 Andre Roberts (2010) 2 time FCS All-American wide receiver, holds numerous school records for receiving and kick returning.  Arizona Cardinals 2010–2013, Washington Redskins 2014–15, Detroit Lions 2016, Atlanta Falcons 2017, New York Jets 2018, Buffalo Bills 2019-21, Houston Texans/Los Angeles Chargers 2021-. Selected to the 2018 All Pro team as well as the 2018, 2019 and 2020 Pro Bowl as a Return Specialist.
 Cortez Allen (2010) cornerback, Pittsburgh Steelers 2011–16
 Chris McGuiness (2010) 1st Base Texas Rangers 2013
 Asher Wojciechowski (2010) Pitcher, US National team 2009; Southern Conference Pitcher of the Year 2010; Houston Astros 2015, Cincinnati Reds 2017, Baltimore Orioles 2017-
 Dee Delaney (2017) 2 time FCS All American and 3 time All Southern Conference defensive back, second on career interception list with 13. Cornerback Jacksonville Jaguars/Miami Dolphins 2018, Washington Redskins 2019, Tampa Bay Buccaneers 2021
 Noah Dawkins (2018) Linebacker Cincinnati Bengals/Tampa Bay Buccaneers 2019, New York Jets 2020–21
 JP Sears (baseball) (2017)  Pitcher New York Yankees/Oakland Athletics 2022-
 Raleigh Webb (2019) Wide Receiver Baltimore Ravens/New England Patriots 2022

Government
 Johnson Hagood (1847) S.C. State Comptroller 1876–80, Governor of South Carolina 1880–82.  CSA Brigadier General
 Hugh S. Thompson (1856) S.C. Superintendent of Education 1876–82, Governor of South Carolina 1882–86, Assistant U.S. Treasury Secretary 1886–89, U.S. Civil Service Commissioner 1889–92.  Thompson Hall is named for him.
 Thomas B. Ferguson (1861) U.S. Ambassador to Sweden 1894–1898.
 George Johnstone (1865) U.S. Congressman from South Carolina 1891–93
 Joseph H. Earle (1866) S.C. State Representative 1878–82, State Senator 1882–86, South Carolina Attorney General 1886–90, United States Senator 1897
 William E. Gonzales (1886) U.S. Ambassador to Cuba 1913–19 and Peru 1920–22
 Charles E. Daniel (1918) United States Senator from South Carolina 1954
 Marvin Griffin (1929) Lt. Governor of Georgia, 1949-1955, and Governor of Georgia 1955–59
 RADM James C. Tison Jr. (1929), sixth Director of the United States Coast and Geodetic Survey, first director of the Environmental Science Services Administration Corps
 George Bell Timmerman Jr. (1937) Lt. Governor 1947–55, Governor of South Carolina 1955–59
 Marion Hartzog Smoak (1938) S.C. State Senator 1966-68, United States Chief of Protocol 1969-74, Presidential Transition Team for Ronald Reagan, 1980–81
 Ernest Hollings (1942) S.C. State Representative 1949–55, Lt. Governor 1955–59, Governor of South Carolina 1959–63, United States Senator 1966–2005
 John C. West (1942) S.C. State Senator 1954–66, Lt. Governor 1966–70, Governor of South Carolina 1971–75, U.S. Ambassador to Saudi Arabia 1977–81
 LTG George M. Seignious, US Army (1942) Director, Arms Control and Disarmament Agency 1979–81; Delegate at Large for Arms Control 1981–84.  
 Harlan E. Mitchell (1943) U.S. Congressman from Georgia 1957–60, Georgia State Senator 1960–62
 A. Lee Chandler (1944) S.C. State Representative 1972–76; Associate Justice and Chief Justice of the South Carolina Supreme Court 1984–94
 Burnet R. Maybank Jr. (1945) S.C. State Representative 1953–58; Lt. Governor of South Carolina 1959–63
 Tim Valentine (1949) North Carolina House of Representatives 1955-60, U.S. Congressman from North Carolina 1982–94
 W. Brantley Harvey Jr. (1951) S.C. State Representative 1958–74, Lt. Governor 1975–79
 James B. Culbertson (1960) U.S. Ambassador to The Netherlands 2008–09
 Langhorne "Tony" Motley (1960) Alaska Commissioner of Commerce and Economic Development 1975-77, U.S. Ambassador to Brazil 1981–83, Assistant Secretary of State 1983–85
 William H. O'Dell (1960) S.C. State Senator 1988–2016
 Joseph P. Riley Jr. (1964) S.C. State Representative 1968–74, Mayor of Charleston, South Carolina 1975–2015
 Bob Hall (1964) Texas State Senator 2015–
 Lt. Gen. Frank Libutti USMC (1966) 1st New York City Deputy Police Commissioner for Counterterrorism 2001–03; Undersecretary, Department of Homeland Security 2003–05
 CAPT William J. Luti USN (1975) National Security Advisor to Vice President Dick Cheney 2001, Deputy Undersecretary of Defense 2001–05, Special Assistant to President George W. Bush 2005–09
 Steve Buyer (1980) U.S. Congressman from Indiana 1992–2010. Buyer Auditorium in Mark Clark Hall is named for him.
 Lt. Gen. Hussein Al-Majali (1981) Jordanian Ambassador to Bahrain 2005–10, Interior Minister of Jordan 2013–15
 George C. James (1982) current Associate Justice, South Carolina Supreme Court
 J. Gresham Barrett (1983) S.C. State Representative 1996–2002, U.S. Congressman from South Carolina 2002–10
 Thom Goolsby (1984) North Carolina State Senator 2011–14
 Carlos Hopkins (1993) Special Counsel to the Governor of Virginia and Secretary of Veterans Affairs 2014-22
 Christian McDaniel (1997) Kentucky State Senator 2012–present
 Nancy Mace (1999) First female cadet graduate; South Carolina State Representative 2018–2021, U.S. Congresswoman from South Carolina 2021–present

Other
 Peter Fayssoux Stevens (1849) 4th Superintendent of the South Carolina Military Academy; commanded cadets who fired on the Star of the West, Commanded the Holcombe Legion in the Civil War, Bishop of South Carolina in the Reformed Episcopal Church.
 Ellison Capers (1857) 1st President of Sewanee University; CSA Brigadier General and Episcopal Bishop of South Carolina. Brother Francis W. Capers was SCMA Superintendent 1853-59 and Capers Hall, the main academic building on campus is named in honor of both men.
 Colonel Oliver James Bond, SCM (1886) Superintendent/President 1908-31; wrote the first detailed school history entitled The Story of The Citadel
 William Ephraim Mikell (1890), Dean of the University of Pennsylvania Law School
 Dr. William H. Muller Jr. (1940) Prominent Cardiologist and first surgeon to implant an artificial aortic valve.  Longtime Chairman of the Department of Surgery and Vice President of the University of Virginia Health System, past President of the American College of Surgeons
 Calder Willingham (1944) novelist, playwright and Oscar nominee; screenplays included One-Eyed Jacks, The Graduate and Little Big Man
 Arland D. Williams Jr. (1957) – saved five other passengers following the crash of Air Florida Flight 90 into the 14th Street Bridge and Potomac River in Washington, DC on January 13, 1982. Williams passed the lifeline lowered for him by a rescue helicopter to others, and died as a result. Posthumously awarded the Coast Guard Gold Lifesaving Medal by President Reagan, 14th Street Bridge over Potomac River named in his honor. [Note – Lt. Col. George Mattar (1963) also died in the Air Florida crash]
 Dr. John Palms (1958) President of Georgia State University and the University of South Carolina
 Pat Conroy (1967) best-selling author whose works include The Great Santini, The Water Is Wide, The Lords of Discipline, The Prince of Tides, Beach Music, South of Broad and My Losing Season
 James O. Rigney Jr. (1974) author (as Robert Jordan) of the best-selling The Wheel of Time series and many other works under various names
 Lu Parker (1992-MAT) Miss USA 1994
 Morris Robinson (1991) 3 time All American football player and Grammy nominated opera singer who has performed at Carnegie Hall, La Scala in Milan, Italy and the Sydney Opera House. First black artist to sign a recording deal with a major classical label.

Fictitious Alumni 
Frank Underwood, fictional Majority Whip of US House of Representatives, Vice President of the United States and 46th President of the United States,main character on the TV series House of Cards (The Sentinel based on the Citadel )

References